"How Bad Do You Want It (Oh Yeah)" is a song by American singer Sevyn Streeter. It was released on February 24, 2015, as the second single from the soundtrack album, Furious 7. The song samples the Aero Chord's Festival Trap Remix of Ultra Music's duo Bang La Decks' 2013 single "Utopia".

Music video
The lyric video for "How Bad Do You Want It (Oh Yeah)" was released on Streeter's official YouTube channel on February 23, 2015. 
The official music video was released on May 4, 2015 on the channel. The music video was shot in Abu Dhabi, United Arab Emirates.

Charts

References

2015 songs
2015 singles
Sevyn Streeter songs
Atlantic Records singles
Songs written by Chloe Angelides
Songs written by DJ Frank E
Song recordings produced by DJ Frank E
Fast & Furious music